General elections were held in Bermuda on 9 February 1989. The result was a victory for the United Bermuda Party, which won 23 of the 40 seats in the House of Assembly.

Results

References

Elections in Bermuda
Bermuda
1989 in Bermuda
Bermuda
February 1989 events in North America
Election and referendum articles with incomplete results